Success Pond is a  water body located in Coos County in northern New Hampshire, United States, in the township of Success. Water from the pond flows west via Chickwolnepy Stream to the Androscoggin River.

There are a number of summer houses, cottages, and cabins located on the pond. Recreational uses include swimming, boating, and fishing.

The lake is classified as a coldwater fishery, with observed species including brook trout, rainbow trout, brown trout, smallmouth bass, and largemouth bass.

See also

List of lakes in New Hampshire

References

Lakes of Coös County, New Hampshire